Jack Parrington (born 24 October 1933) is a Canadian sprinter. He competed in the men's 100 metres at the 1956 Summer Olympics. That year, he tied the world record for the 100-metres dash at 10.2 seconds. He attended Houston University, where he was a business administration student.

References

External links
 

1933 births
Living people
Athletes (track and field) at the 1956 Summer Olympics
Canadian male sprinters
Olympic track and field athletes of Canada
Sportspeople from Scarborough, Toronto
Athletes from Toronto